Dowlahtu or Dowlehtu may refer to:
 Dowlahtu, Gavork-e Nalin
 Dowlehtu, Melkari